The Croatian Indoors in Split was a one-off men's tennis event on the ATP Tour. The tournament was played on carpet and featured both  men's singles and  men's doubles tournament. 

In 1996 and 1997 the tournament under the name Croatian Indoors was held in Zagreb. It was an indoor tournament played on carpet courts that featured both men's singles and doubles tournaments. In 1998 the tournament was moved to Split and was held for only one season under the name Croatian Indoors.

Past finals

Singles

Doubles

See also
List of tennis tournaments

References

External links

Tennis tournaments in Croatia
Indoor tennis tournaments
Carpet court tennis tournaments
1998 establishments in Croatia